Lepanthes excedens is a species of orchid native to Central America.

References

External links 

excedens
Orchids of Central America